Sher Qilla Valley: or Sherqilla is a village in Ghizer District,  from Gilgit, Pakistan. It is the largest village of Ghizer District by area.  The Ghizer District ضلع غذر‎ formed in 1974 is the westernmost part of the Gilgit-Baltistan region of Pakistan. Currently, it is proposed to split Ghizer District  into two 2 districts.

 The western part of Ghizer District  includes the actual Ghizer/ Ghizer Valley of Phander, Gupis and Yasin. The name as Ghizer District  will be kept with this region due to the connectivity to its origin.
 While the eastern part of the current District will include Puniyal and Ishkoman. And probably the newly district would be given the name as Puniyal-Ishkoman District.
 Sherqilla Valley is located in eastern part of Ghizer District. The tehsil of Sherqilla valley is Puniyal.

WAYS OF ENTRANCE (داخلہِ کے راستے)

Sherqilla has 2 main bridges which connect the Ghizer road with Sherqilla valley, one is Wooden Bridge and the other one is RCC Bridge. The wooden Bridge is made in the 90s. And the RCC Bridge is formed in (May-2020), it took more than 6 years for the completion of this bridge. It is fully operational today with a huge influx of tourists and cargo vehicles coming towards the valley.

RCC BRIDGE OF SHERQILLA:(شیرقلعہ کا آر سی سی پُل)
WOODEN BRIDGE OF SHERQILLA VALLEY: (شیر قلعہ کی لکڑی کا پل)
EDUCATION SYSTEM: ( نظام تعلیم )

Education
Literacy rate in sherqilla is 80% with less than 47 percent of women being literate and more than 50 percent of men in 2021. The village has a government boys high school and government girls high school, Pilot School and a private school, The Aga Khan Higher Secondary Schoo. Aga khan Higher Secondary School is retired in 2017.

Gallery

Populated places in Ghizer District
Villages in Pakistan